The Instinet Classic was a golf tournament on the Champions Tour from 1985 to 2002. It was played in several different cities in Pennsylvania and New Jersey.

The purse for the 2002 tournament was US$1,500,000, with $225,000 going to the winner. The tournament was founded in 1985 as the United Hospitals Senior Golf Championship.

Tournament locations

Winners
2002 Isao Aoki
2001 Gil Morgan
2000 Gil Morgan

Bell Atlantic Classic
1999 Tom Jenkins
1998 Jay Sigel
1997 Bob Eastwood
1996 Dale Douglass
1995 Jim Colbert
1994 Lee Trevino
1993 Bob Charles
1992 Lee Trevino
1991 Jim Ferree
1990 Dale Douglass

Bell Atlantic/St. Christopher's Classic
1989 Dave Hill

United Hospitals Classic
1988 Bruce Crampton

United Hospitals Senior Golf Championship
1987 Chi-Chi Rodríguez
1986 Gary Player
1985 Don January

Source:

References

Former PGA Tour Champions events
Golf in Pennsylvania
Golf in New Jersey
Chester County, Pennsylvania
Princeton, New Jersey
Recurring sporting events established in 1985 
Recurring sporting events disestablished in 2002
1985 establishments in Pennsylvania
2002 disestablishments in New Jersey